The Other I is a studio album by English duo 2:54. It was released in November 2014 under Bella Union.

Track listing

References

2014 albums
2:54 albums
Bella Union albums